Ysgol Uwchradd Caergybi is a secondary school in Holyhead, Anglesey. It claims to be the first comprehensive school in England and Wales, opening in 1949 as Holyhead County School.

History
The school was formed in 1949 with the amalgamation of Holyhead Grammar and St Cybi Secondary school and became the first comprehensive in the UK.

There was a number of reasons for the school to be the first "comp". The headmaster Mr Hughes was retiring and he was to be replaced by an enthusiast for Comprehensive education, Trefor Lovett. The new head became known as "the first apostle of the comprehensive movement." The transition was also assisted by the close proximity of St Cybi Secondary school and Holyhead Grammar; the schools that would be replaced. Obviously the backing of Anglesey Education Committee was essential.

The changes that Lovett brought about were not unexpected as he had previously taught locally at Vaynor and Penderyn schools. The new school was certain that a child's future should not be determined at age eleven with the eleven plus exam. Previously children in Wales had all sat an exam at the end of their junior school education and this decided whether they would attend the grammar school or a secondary modern school. Lovett was convinced that this was unfair and that there should be a firm catchment area so that all the students irrespective of their background or abilities would attend the one school.

After two years, the new head reported,

The school today

In 2006 there were approximately 850 pupils in the school which included about 100 in the sixth form. The school had falling rolls in the years before and is much reduced since there were questions in the early 1960s in the House of Commons to then Education Minister Chris Chataway enquiring how the school was to cope with a roll of 1400 pupils. In 2010 the school exceeded the local authority's projected figures.

Twelve per cent of the students are able to speak Welsh fluently and four per cent have Welsh as their first language. The catchment area of the school is mainly the town of Holyhead and the area around the school has been highlighted as an area for development with nearly 30% of households having no wage earner. Estyn visited the school in 2008 and commended the school with regards to teaching and pupil behaviour.

Five years ago the school moved its sixth form out of the old red brick Cybi building and put that in the control of the local authority. Since then the building has become dilapidated and the education authority announced in 2008 it intended to demolish the building. The building was still standing as of 2012. As a result of the intervention of local county councillor, Robert Llewelyn Jones, CADW has given the façade a Grade 2 listing. This listing has prevented the local authority from continuing with its demolition plans and the site is now earmarked for a new super-primary school (subject to funding being available).

At present virtually all pupils in the Ysgol Uwchradd Caergybi catchment area choose the school for their secondary education. The school's pupil numbers continues to rise and recent significant funding towards a new canteen/refrectory and technology block has succeeded in improving the school's facilities dramatically.

Notable former pupils

of the comprehensive
Glenys Kinnock, politician 
Tracey Morris, athlete 
Albert Owen, politician
Tony Roberts, Former Welsh International and QPR goalkeeper
Dawn French, comedian/actress

of predecessor schools
Cledwyn Hughes (1916–2002) Baron Cledwyn of Penrhos 
David Williams (1877–1927) Professor in Pastoral Theology

References

Educational institutions established in 1949
Secondary schools in Anglesey
1949 establishments in Wales
Holyhead